Daniel Moulinet (born 9 January 1957) is a French priest and historian, professor of contemporary history at the Catholic University of Lyon.

Works 
Les Classiques païens dans les collèges catholiques ? Le combat de Mgr Gaume, (Histoire religieuse de la France, 6), Paris, Le Cerf, 1995, 485 p. 
Sources et méthodes en histoire religieuse, Lyon, Profac, 2000, 192 p.
Béatifiés de l’an 2000. Pie IX, Jean XXIII, Guillaume-Joseph Chaminade, Dom Columba Marmion, Tommaso Reggio, Paris, 2000, 204 p.
Guide bibliographique des sciences religieuses, Paris, Salvator, 2000, 488 p.
Le Concile Vatican II, (Tout simplement, 34), Paris, Éditions de l’Atelier, 2002, 192 p.
La Séparation des Églises et de l’État en Bourbonnais, Yzeure, Amis du Patrimoine Religieux en Bourbonnais, 2004, 283 p.
Genèse de la laïcité. À travers les textes fondamentaux de 1801 à 1959 (Droit civil ecclésiastique), Paris, Éditions du Cerf, 2005, 303 p.
Laïcat catholique et société française. Les Comités catholiques (1870-1905) (« Histoire religieuse de la France », 33), Paris, Le Cerf, 2008, 592 p.
Au cœur du monde. Henri Chaumont, un prêtre dans l’Esprit de Jésus, Éd. Beaurepaire – Société Saint-François-de-Sales, 2010, 292 p.
Vatican II raconté à ceux qui ne l’ont pas vécu, Paris, Éditions de l’Atelier, 2012, 111 p.
L’Église catholique à Montluçon au XXe siècle, Yzeure, APRB, 2012, 478 p.
Prêtres soldats dans la Grande Guerre. Les clercs bourbonnais sous les drapeaux, Rennes, Presses universitaires de Rennes, 2014, 336 p. ill.
Université catholique de Lyon. Entre passé et avenir, Toulouse, Privat, 2015, 160 p. ill.
L’Église, la guerre et la paix, Paris, Le Cerf, 2016, 265 p.

in collaboration
 Nadine-Josette Chaline, Gardiens de la mémoire. Les monuments aux morts de la Grande Guerre dans l’Allier, Yzeure, Amis du Patrimoine religieux en Bourbonnais, 2008, 328 p.
Direction de : Vitraux du XIXe siècle en Bourbonnais-Auvergne, Yzeure, Amis du Patrimoine religieux en Bourbonnais, 1992, 145 p.
Direction de : L’Histoire en christianisme. Hommage à Jean Comby, Lyon, Profac, 2002, 116 p.
Direction de : La Séparation de 1905 : les hommes et les lieux, Paris, Éd. de l’Atelier, 2005, 274 p.
Direction de : Théologie et politique. Cent ans après la loi de 1905, Lyon, Profac, 2007, 326p.
Codirection de : Le Diaconat permanent. Relectures et perspectives (« Théologies  »), Paris, Le Cerf, 2007, 375 p.
Codirection de : Jubilé et culte marial (Moyen Âge – Époque contemporaine), Publications de l’université de Saint-Étienne, 2009,

As publisher
Édition de Paul Pelletier, évêque de Moulins (1850–1893), Charroux, Éditions des Cahiers Bourbonnais, 1994, 482 p.
Edition (en collaboration avec Jean-Noël Dumont) de Charles de Montalembert, L’Église libre dans l’État libre, précédé des Intérêts catholiques au XIXe siècle (La nuit surveillée), Paris, Le Cerf, 2010, 475 p.
Adaptation française de Manfred Heim, Les dates-clés de l’histoire de l’Église, Paris, Salvator, 2007, 352 p.
Édition de Michel Cancouët, L’Afrique au Concile. Journal d’un expert, Rennes, Presses universitaires de Rennes, 2013, 240 p.

Last articles
« Bilan historiographique sur la séparation des Églises et de l’État en France », dans L’État sans confession. La laïcité à Genève (1907) et dans les contextes suisse et français (Michel Grandjean et Sarah Scholl dir.), (« Histoire et société », 51), Genève, Labor et Fides, 2010, p. 139-170.
« Réactions catholiques face aux tentatives d’union des Églises au début du XXe siècle », La Conférence missionnaire mondiale Édimbourg 1910. Histoire et missions chrétiennes, n° 13, mars 2010, p. 137-154.
« Le groupe Chevalier et les réseaux lyonnais », dans Humanisme et philosophie citoyenne. Joseph Vialatoux et Jean Lacroix (Emmanuel Gabellieri et Paul Moreau dir.), Paris, DDB – Lethielleux, 2010, p. 181-202.
Notices “Bougon”, “Gonon”, “Jacquin”, “Penon”, “Quelen”, Dictionnaire des évêques de France au XXe siècle, (Dominique-Marie Dauzet et Frédéric Le Moigne dir.), Paris, Le Cerf, 2010, p. 94-95, 305-306, 354-355, 518, 551-552.
« L’engagement des laïcs catholiques au XIXe siècle », dans Les Laïcs en mission ecclésiale, Esprit et vie, hors série n° 2, novembre 2010, p. 19-36.
« Jean-Marie Vianney, figure de prêtre, et sa réception dans l’histoire », Théophilyon, 2010, XV-2, p. 421-450.
« Notices : "Montaignac (Louise de)", "Noaillat (Marthe de", "Raffin (Louise de)", "Tamisier (Émilie)" », dans : Anne Cova et Bruno Dumons dir., Destins de femmes. Religion, culture et société France XIXe-XXe siècles, (Mémoire chrétienne au présent), Paris, Letouzey et Ané, 2010, p. 290-292, 301-302, 339-340, 413-415.
« Débats autour du culte des images en Église », Lignes de crêtes, n°10, (2010), p. 18-19.
« El santo cura de Ars como figura de sacerdote y su recepción en la historia », dans : Gabina Uribarri Bilbao dir., El Ser sacerdotal. Fundamentos y dimensiones constitutivas,  (Publicaciones de la Universidad pontificia Comillas, Teología, 02), Madrid, San Pablo – Universidad pontificia Comillas, 2010, p. 265-283.
« Lacordaire : un catholique libéral », Lumière et vie, tome LX-1, p. 57-66.
« Le curé d’Ars et la Vierge Marie », María en los caminos de santidad cristiana. Ephemerides mariologicae, LXI-1, (January–March 2011), p. 33-46.
« Regard rétrospectif sur l’apostolat des laïcs en France », Esprit et vie, n°237, juillet 2011, p. 13-22, n°238, août 2011, p. 10-20.
« Le diocèse de Lyon et la loi de Séparation 1905 », La Grâce d’une cathédrale. Lyon primatiale des Gaules, (Philippe Barbarin dir.), Strasbourg, La Nuée bleue, 2011, p. 443-449.
« Émile Amagat (1841–1915) », Revue de l’Université catholique de Lyon, n°20, 2011, p. 87-90.
« Autour de Charles de Montalembert : un parti catholique ? », Les catholiques et la démocratie, (Jean-Noël Dumont dir.), Lyon, Le collège supérieur, 2012, p. 29-51.
« Réflexions sur l’herméneutique de Vatican II », La Documentation catholique, n°2483, 5 February 2012, p. 145-148.
« Les Comités catholiques. Pour la restauration d’une monarchie chrétienne en France ? », “Blancs” et contre-révolutionnaires en Europe. Espaces, réseaux, cultures et mémoires (fin XVIIIe – début XXe siècles) (Bruno Dumons et Hilaire Multon dir.), (« Collection de l’École française de Rome »), Rome, École française, 2011, p. 295-305.
« Charles de Montalembert et Louis Veuillot », Charles de Montalembert et ses contemporains, (Jean-Noël Dumont dir.), (La nuit surveillée), Paris, Le Cerf, 2012, p. 67-84.
“Regard sur l’histoire de l’Église catholique à Montluçon au XXe siècle”, Bulletin des Amis de Montluçon, n° 63 (2012), p. 7-28.
“Le synode des évêques sur les laïcs de 1987”, Théophilyon, XVII-1, 2012, p. 153-171.
“L’Université catholique de Lyon des origines au milieu du XXe siècle”, Les universités et instituts catholiques. Regards sur leur histoire (1870-1950), (Guy Bedouelle et Olivier Landron dir.), Paris, Parole et Silence, 2012, p. 35-50.
“Vatican II et les signes des temps”, Spiritus, 208, septembre 2012, p. 263-270 ; trad. espagnole, Spiritus. Edicion hispanoamericana, 208, septembre 2012, p. 97-103.
“Mgr Odon Thibaudier (1823-1892)”, Revue de l’Université catholique de Lyon, n° 22, 2012, p. 71-73.
“La liberté religieuse comme refus de domination”, Lignes de crêtes, n°17, octobre-décembre 2012, p. 19-20.
“Sources et élaboration de l’histoire du concile Vatican II”, Archives de l’Église de France, n°78, 2nd semester 2012, p. 27-29.
“Un concile, pour quoi faire ?”, Vatican II, un concile pour le monde, Monaco, Archevêché de Monaco, 2013, p. 15-31.
L’usage de la notion de ‘signes des temps’ au concile Vatican II”, Signes des temps, traces de Dieu. Théophilyon, tome XVIII, vol. 1, 2013, p. 27-44.
“Notes pour servir à l’histoire des églises de Neuilly-le-Réal, Saint-Pourçain-sur-Besbre et Vaumas, visitées lors de l’excursion du mois de juin 2013”, Nos églises bourbonnaises, n° 26 (2013), p. 25-90.
“Les Comités catholiques et l’apprentissage de la modération (1870-1905)”, Les « chrétiens modérés » en France et en Europe, 1870-1960, (Jacques Prévotat et Jean Vavasseur-Desperriers dir.), Villeneuve d’Ascq, Presses universitaires du Septentrion, 2013, p. 179-193.
“Le concile Vatican II dans la province d’Auvergne”, Actes des journées Anniversaire Vatican II, Clermont-Ferrand, ITA, 2013, p. 19-32.
“Montalembert et le défi du choix de la liberté”, Montalembert pensatore europeo, (Manuel Ceretta et Mario Tesini dir.), Roma, Ed. Studium, 2013, p. 289-306.
“La résistance spirituelle à la lecture des Cahiers du témoignage chrétien”, Résistance de l’esprit – esprit de Résistance. Échos saléviens, n° 21, Annecy, La Salévienne, 2014, p. 95-103.
“Emmanuel Mounier à la prison Saint-Paul de Lyon”, Revue de l’Université catholique de Lyon, n° 25, juin 2014, p. 9-16.
“Pascal Thomas. Des laïcs acteurs d’une théologie pratique”, Les laïcs prennent la parole. Débats et controverses dans le catholicisme après Vatican II. Actes du colloque 30 janvier – 1er février 2014, (Jean-François Galinnier-Pallerola, Philippe Foro et Augustin Laffay dir.), Paris, Parole et Silence, 2014, p. 183-201.
“L’église Sainte-Croix [de Gannat] à l’époque contemporaine”, Nos églises bourbonnaises, n°27 (2014), p. 58-86.
“L’université au fil de l’histoire”, Théophilyon, tome XIX-2, 2014, p. 315-329.
“De Léon XIII à Pie XI, la référence à la ‘chrétienté’, hier, aujourd’hui, demain”, dans La mémoire chrétienne, une mémoire sélective, (Jean-Marie Gueulette dir.), Paris, Le Cerf, 2015, p. 13-29.
“Correspondance de guerre de l’abbé Georges Malvielle”, La Feuille de garance, n° 36, July 2015, p. 30-45.
“L’Église et la ‘pastorale de la peur’”, L’inquiétude : peut-on y échapper ? Croire, n° 301, September 2015, p. 29-32.
“Églises et vie religieuse dans la région gannatoise : Charroux, Naves, Veauce, Vicq. Excursion du 8 mai 2015”, Nos églises bourbonnaises, n° 28, novembre 2015, p. 37-108.
“Prêtres et séminaristes bourbonnais prisonniers de guerre (1914-1918)”, Bulletin de la Société d’histoire et d’archéologie de Vichy et de ses environs, n° 1165, 2nd semester 2015, p. 7-27.
“L’Université catholique de Lyon de 1965 à nos jours”, 50 ans de catholicisme à Lyon. De Vatican II à nos jours (1965-2015), (Bernadette Angleraud, Valérie Aubourg et Olivier Charelan dir.), (« Histoire des mondes chrétiens »), Paris, Karthala, 2016, 183-195.

External links 
 Daniel Moulinet on data.bnf.fr
 Daniel Moulinet on Laboratoire de Recherche historique Rhône-Alpes
 Daniel Moulinet, Figures et courants du catholicisme français contemporain on Chrétiens et société
 Père Daniel Moulinet - Vatican II: le destin contrasté de deux constitutions concilaires on YouTube
  Daniel Moulinet, Guide bibliographique des sciences religieuses. 2000 (note bibliographique) on Persée
 Publications on CAIRN

20th-century French historians
21st-century French historians
French historians of religion
1957 births
Living people